Joël Bouzou  (born 30 October 1955) is a former French athlete and World Champion of modern pentathlon in 1987. Bouzou is the President of the World Olympians Association.

Biography

Sports career 
Bouzou grew up in Auch, in a sporting family. His father was a PE teacher and Joël participated in many different sports, so that he naturally discovered Modern Pentathlon.

He participated in four Olympic Games (Moscow 1980, Los Angeles 1984, Seoul 1988, Barcelona 1992) and won the team bronze medal in 1984. He won the Modern Pentathlon World Championships in 1987, beating Milan Kadlec. He is currently Vice-President of the Union Internationale de Pentathlon Moderne.

A member of the Executive Committee for the World Olympians Association (WOA) from 2003–2008, Bouzou also founded a French association Rassemblement par le Sport (Together through Sport) with the aim of helping to socially integrate young people living in volatile suburbs in France through sport.

Peace and sport 
Bouzou is President and Founder of a global initiative called Peace and Sport L’Organisation pour la Paix par le Sport founded in 2007 to promote the use of sport to foster dialogue and reconciliation everywhere where it's needed.

Peace and Sport, is a neutral international organization based in the Principality of Monaco and placed under the High Patronage of H.S.H. Prince Albert II of Monaco.

Distinctions and other activities 
In France, Bouzou is an Officer in The National Order of Merit and decorated with the Legion of Honour, one of the highest civil distinctions of the French Republic. He also holds the Gold Medal for Youth and Sport (in France) and the Silver Medal for Youth and Sport (in Monaco).

In March 2010 he was awarded a Honoris Causa Doctorate in Humane Letters from the University for Peace in recognition of "his unique worldwide leadership role in promoting peace and mutual understanding among different cultures, and his leadership of organizations devoted to these objectives".

He is also an advisor to H.S.H. Prince Albert II of Monaco.

In December 2011, Bouzou was elected president of the World Olympians Association on a four-year term. He was re-elected in 2015 for another four-year term unopposed. In 2020, was again re-elected as President of World Olympians Association after standing unopposed at the 2020 WOA General Assembly.

Sports career

Olympic Games 
1992, in Barcelona:
 Individual, 17th
 Team, 7th
1988, in Seoul:
 Individual, 8th
 Team, 4th
1984, in Los Angeles:
 Individual, 17th
 Team, Bronze Medal
1980, in Moscow:
 Individual, 20th
 Team, 5th

World Championships 
 Individual
1987,  Gold Medal
1982,  Bronze Medal
 Team
1983, Bronze Medal
1986, Bronze Medal

References

External links 
 Joël Bouzou sur France Olympique
 

Living people
1955 births
People from Auch
French male modern pentathletes
Olympic medalists in modern pentathlon
Olympic bronze medalists for France
Modern pentathletes at the 1980 Summer Olympics
Modern pentathletes at the 1984 Summer Olympics
Modern pentathletes at the 1988 Summer Olympics
Modern pentathletes at the 1992 Summer Olympics
Medalists at the 1984 Summer Olympics
Presidents of the World Olympians Association
Sportspeople from Gers